Maksim Aleksandrovich Mysin (born 12 December 1979) is a former Russian professional footballer.

Club career
He played in the Russian Football National League for FC Lada Togliatti in 2003.

References

1979 births
Footballers from Tambov
Living people
Russian footballers
Association football defenders
FC Spartak Tambov players
FC Lada-Tolyatti players
FC Okzhetpes players
Kazakhstan Premier League players
Russian expatriate footballers
Expatriate footballers in Kazakhstan
Russian expatriate sportspeople in Kazakhstan
FC Nosta Novotroitsk players